McCord is an unincorporated community in Lincoln and Oneida counties in the U.S. state of Wisconsin. The Lincoln County portion of McCord is in the town of Wilson, while the Oneida County portion is in the town of Little Rice. The community was named after Myron H. McCord, a territorial governor of Arizona and member of the Wisconsin State Senate and the U.S. House of Representatives.

References

Unincorporated communities in Lincoln County, Wisconsin
Unincorporated communities in Oneida County, Wisconsin
Unincorporated communities in Wisconsin